This is a list of women artists who were born in Denmark or whose artworks are closely associated with that country.

A
Gudrun Stig Aagaard (1895–1986), textile artist
Astrid Aagesen (1883–1965), designer working with tin and silver, active in Helsingborg, Sweden
Nanna Aakjær (1874–1962), carpenter and woodcarver
Naja Abelsen (born 1964), Greenlandic painter and illustrator
Lene Adler Petersen (born 1944), multidisciplinary artist
Margrethe Agger (born 1943), textile artist specializing in tapestry
Else Alfelt (1910–1974), painter
Catherine Engelhart Amyot (1845–1926), portrait and genre painter
Anna Ancher (1859–1935), painter associated with the Skagen Painters
Helga Ancher (1883–1964), painter, daughter of Anna and Michael Ancher
Rigmor Andersen (1903–1995), furniture designer
Astrid Andreasen (born 1948), Faroese textile and graphic artist
Pia Arke (1958–2007), Greenlandic visual and performance artist, writer and photographer
Aggi Ásgerð Ásgeirsdóttir (born 1966), Faroese visual artist

B
Marie Vilhelmine Bang (1848–1932), painter
Magdalene Bärens (1737–1808), painter
Merete Barker (born 1944), painter, contemporary artist
Gerda Bengtsson (1900–1995), textile artist
Johanne Bindesbøll (1851–1934), textile artist
Malene Birger (born 1962), fashion designer
Agnete Bjørneboe (born 1943), painter, mosaic artist and paper cutter
Anna Sofie Boesen Dreijer (1899–1986), schoolteacher and textile artist
Elisa Maria Boglino (1905–2002), painter
Thyra Boldsen (1884–1968), sculptor
Elna Borch (1869–1950), sculptor 
Birthe Bovin (1908–1980), painter
Elise Brandes (1873–1918), sculptor
Margit Brandt (1945–2011), fashion designer
Lilian Brøgger (born 1950), illustrator
Birthe Bovin (1906–1980), painter associated with the Odsherred Painters
Lilian Brøgger (born 1950), illustrator
Laura Brun-Pedersen (1883–1961), landscape painter
Eva Louise Buus (born 1979), painter

C
Louise Campbell (born 1970), furniture and lighting designer
Anne Marie Carl-Nielsen (1863–1945), sculptor
Ebba Carstensen (1885–1967), Cubist painter
Anthonore Christensen (1849–1926), flower painter
Kirsten Christensen (born 1943), painter and ceramist
Franciska Clausen (1899–1986), painter
Marie Jeanne Clemens (1755–1791), French-Danish engraver, pastel artist
Kirsten Christensen (born 1943), painter, ceramist
Viera Collaro (born 1946), light art specialist
Hedvig Collin (1880–1964), painter, illustrator and children's writer
Lilibeth Cuenca Rasmussen (born 1970), Philippine-born video and performance artist

D
Dorte Dahlin (born 1955), painter, graphic artist
Inger Lut Debois (1931–2015), painter, headed the Danish Society of Female Artists
Kirsten Dehlholm (born 1945), scenic artist
Nanna Ditzel (1923–2005), furniture designer
Augusta Dohlmann (1847–1914), painter
Helen Dohlmann (1870–1942), sculptor
Bertha Dorph (1875–1960), painter, designer
Margrete Drejer (1889–1975), textile artist
Kirsten Dufour (born 1941), visual artist

E
Maja Lisa Engelhardt (born 1956), painter
Tina Enghoff (born 1957), photographer, video artist and writer
Lisa Engqvist (1914–1989), ceramist
Merete Erbou Laurent (born 1949), weaver and magazine editor
Helle-Vibeke Erichsen (1940–2016), etcher, painter, created caricatures of people she met
Gutte Eriksen (1918–2008), ceramist
Charlotte Eskildsen (born 1975), fashion designer
Helga Exner (born 1939), Czech-born Danish goldsmith and jeweller

F
Julie Fagerholt (born 1968), fashion designer
Sonja Ferlov Mancoba (1911–1984), avant-garde sculptor
Else Fischer-Hansen (1905–1996), abstract painter
Helga Foght (1902–1974), textile artist
Elna Fonnesbech-Sandberg (1892–1994), art collector, painter
Johanna Marie Fosie (1726–1764), Denmark's first professional female artist
 Ingeborg Frederiksen (1886–1976), painter and botanical illustrator
Dagmar Freuchen-Gale (1907–1991), illustrator and writer
Edma Frølich (1859–1958), painter

G
Esther Gehlin (1892–1949), Danish-Swedish painter and textile artist
Emily Gernild (born 1985), Danish-born artist
Irene Griegst (born 1945), Moroccan-born Danish goldsmith
Edith Grøn (1917–1990), Danish-born Nicaraguan sculptor

H
Henriette Hahn-Brinckmann (1862–1934), painter, printmaker
Christina Liljenberg Halstrøm (born 1977), furniture designer
Bente Hammer (born 1950), textile artist and fashion designer
Charlotte Hanmann (born 1950), photographer, painter and graphic artist
Inger Hanmann (1918–2007), painter and enamelwork artist
Karen Hannover (1872–1943), ceramist
Gerda Henning (1891–1951), weaver and textile designer
Gesa Hansen (born 1981), German-Danish furniture designer
Charlotte Haslund-Christensen (born 1963), photographic artist
Emilie Demant Hatt (1873–1958), artist, writer and ethnographer
Irene Hedlund (born 1947), illustrator and children's writer
Effie Hegermann-Lindencrone (1869–1945), porcelain artist
Berit Heggenhougen-Jensen (born 1956), painter
Ella Heide (1871–1956), associated with the younger generation of Skagen painters
Hanne Hellesen (1801–1844), flower painter
Ghita Hempel (1899–1948), painter
Marie Henriques (1866–1944), painter
Louise Hindsgavl (born 1973), ceramic artist
Berit Hjelholt (1920–2016), textile artist
Anne Mette Hjortshøj, contemporary studio potter
Aka Høegh (born 1947), Greenlandic painter, graphic artist and sculptor
Hanna Hoffmann (1868–1917), sculptor, silversmith and textile artist
Nina Hole (1941–2016), ceramist
Astrid Holm (1876–1937), painter and textile artist
Ebba Holm (1889–1967), painter, engraver
Olivia Holm-Møller (1875–1970), painter, sculptor
Sophie Holten (1858–1930), painter
Suzette Holten (1863–1937), painter, ceramist
Anne-Birthe Hove (1951–2012), Greenlandic graphic artist
Jytte Høy (born 1951), contemporary artist, educator
Bizzie Høyer (1888–1971), painter, art teacher
Lone Høyer Hansen (born 1950), sculptor

I
Lucie Ingemann (1792–1868), painter, remembered for altar paintings

J
Ville Jais Nielsen (1886–1949), portrait painter
Grete Jalk (1920–2006), furniture designer
Elisabeth Jerichau-Baumann (1819–1881), Polish-Danish painter
Kirsten Justesen (born 1943), sculptor, scenographer, installation artist

K
Bodil Kaalund (1930–2016), painter, textile artist, church decorator
Sigrid Kähler (1874–1923), ceramist and painter
Jane Jin Kaisen (born 1980), visual artist, filmmaker
Sophia Kalkau (born 1960), multidisciplinary artist
Rita Kernn-Larsen (1904–1998), surrealist painter
Helvig Kinch (1872–1956), painter
Bodil Kjær (born 1932), furniture designer
Elle Klarskov Jørgensen (born 1958), sculptor
Kirsten Kjær (1893–1985), expressive painter
Kirsten Klein (born 1945), photographer
Anna Klindt Sørensen (1899–1985), painter
Vibeke Klint (1927–2019), textile artist
Eva Koch (born 1953), sculptor
Elise Konstantin-Hansen (1858–1946), painter, ceramist
Ann-Mari Kornerup (1918–2006), Swedish-Danish textile artist
Holcha Krake (1885–1944), textile artist
Theodora Krarup (1862–1941), portrait painter
Ellen Krause (1905–1990), painter associated with the Odsherred Painters
Johanne Cathrine Krebs (1848–1924), painter
Nathalie Krebs (1895–1978), potter
Dorthe Kristoffersen (1906–1976), Greenlandic sculptor
K'itura Kristoffersen (born 1939). Greenlandic sculptor
Sara Kristoffersen (1937–2008), Greenlandic sculptor
Charlotte Christiane von Krogh (1827–1913), painter
Marie Krøyer (1867–1940), painter associated with the Skagen Painters

L
Jenny la Cour (1849–1928), textile artist and educator
Marie Gudme Leth (1895–1997), textile designer pioneering screen printing
Kirsten Lockenwitz (born 1932), painter and sculptor
Alexia de Lode (1737–1765), copper-plate etcher
Christine Løvmand (1803–1872), painter
Agnes Lunn (1850–1941), painter, sculptor
Marie Luplau (1848–1925), painter
Anne Marie Lütken (1916–2001), painter
Julie Lütken (1788–1816), early landscape painter
Sigrid Lütken (1915–2008), sculptor focusing on abstract works depicting plants, animals and people
Nanna Lysholt Hansen (fl. 2005–), performance artist and curator

M
Anne Sofie Madsen (born 1979), fashion designer
Lise Malinovsky (born 1957), painter
Thyra Manicus-Hansen (1872–1906), ceramic artist, trade unionist
Cecilie Manz (born 1972), furniture designer
Cathrine Marie Møller (1744–1811), embroiderer
Christel Marott (1919–1992), illustrator, painter and sculptor
Julie Marstrand (1882–1943), Danish sculptor and writer
Helene Moltke-Leth (born 1973), film director and artist
Inger Møller (1886–1979), silversmith
Dea Trier Mørch (1941–2001), artist, writer
Ursula Munch-Petersen (born 1937), ceramist
Emilie Mundt (1842–1922), painter
Jane Muus (1919–2007), painter, illustrator
Elna Mygdal (1868–1940), textile artist, museum director
Vera Myhre (1920–2000), painter and graphic artist

N
Kim Naver (born 1940), designer and textile artist
Elisabeth Neckelmann (1884–1956), painter and head of the Danish Society of Female Artists
Hermania Neergaard (1799–1875), still life painter
Jette Nevers (born 1943), textile artist and designer
Elsa Nielsen (1923–2011), graphic artist
Ville Jais Nielsen (1886–1949), painter
Astrid Noack (1888–1954), sculptor
Ernestine Nyrop (1888–1975), textile artist and fresco painter

O
Tove Ólafsson (1909–1992), sculptor
Dagmar Olrik (1860–1932), painter and tapestry artist
Kirsten Ortwed (born 1948), sculptor
Sara Mathilde Øster (born 1973), painter

P
Sophie Pedersen (1885–1950), painter
Johanne Pedersen-Dan (1860–1934), sculptor
Anna Petersen (1845–1910), painter
Nielsine Petersen (1851–1916), sculptor
Ingeborg Plockross Irminger (1872–1962), sculptor
Etiyé Dimma Poulsen (born 1968), sculptor, ceramist
Gudrun Poulsen (1918–1999), painter, president of Kvindelige Kunstneres Samfund, female artists society
Bolette Puggaard (1798–1847), landscape painter

R
Anu Ramdas (born 1980), artist
Pia Ranslet (born 1956), painter and sculptor
Franka Rasmussen (1907–1994), German-born Danish textile artist
Louise Ravn-Hansen (1849–1909), painter and etcher
Jane Reumert (1942–2016), ceramist
Jytte Rex (born 1942), painter, writer, filmmaker
Lise Ring (born 1936), sculptor and art organization player
Monica Ritterband (born 1955), artist, designer
Elizabeth Romhild (born 1960), Danish-Armenian painter, sculptor and designer

S
Naja Salto (1945–2016), textile artist
Marie Sandholt (1872–1942), painter and ceramist
Anna Sarauw (1839–1919), textile artist
Helen Schou (1905–2006), sculptor
Alev Ebüzziya Siesbye (born 1938), Turkish-Danish ceramist
Vigdis Sigmundsdóttir (1934–2023), Faroese collage artist
Agnes Slott-Møller (1862–1937), symbolist painter
Ruth Smith (1913–1958), Faroese painter
Dagmar Starcke (1899–1975), textile artist
Georgia Skovgaard (1828–1868), embroiderer
Agnes Slott-Møller (1862–1937), painter
Agnes Smidt (1874–1952), painter and Danish culture supporter in Southern Jutland
Eva Sørensen (1940–2019), sculptor, ceramist
Grethe Sørensen (born 1947), textile artist
Dagmar Starcke (1899–1975), painter and textile artist
Nina Sten-Knudsen (born 1957), painter
Birte Stenbak (born 1938), goldsmith and jewellery designer
Gudrun Stig Aagaard (1895–1986), textile designer
Karen Strand (1924–2000), goldsmith, jewellery designer
Kamma Svensson (1908–1998), illustrator
Christine Swane (1876–1960), painter
Anna Syberg (1870–1914), painter

T
Anne Marie Telmányi (1893–1983), painter, writer
Anna Thommesen (1908–2004), textile artist
Emma Thomsen (1820–1897), painter
Pauline Thomsen (1858–1931), painter, art teacher
Helle Thorborg (born 1927), painter and graphic designer
Elisa Marie Thornam (1857–1901), painter and illustrator
Emmy Thornam (1852–1935), flower painter and writer
Ludovica Thornam (1853–1896), painter
Jette Thyssen (born 1933), textile artist
Elisabeth Toubro (born 1956), sculptor
Paula Trock (1889–1979), weaver, textile artist
Eleonora Tscherning (1817–1890), painter, memoirist
Nicoline Tuxen (1847–1931), painter

U
Sara Ulrik (1855–1916), flower painter
Lin Utzon (born 1946), ceramics, textiles
Susanne Ussing (1940–1998), artist, ceramist, architect

V
Ingrid Vang Nyman (1916–1959), illustrator
Hanne Varming (born 1939), sculptor and medallist
Gertrud Vasegaard (1913–2007), ceramist
Hanne Vedel (born 1933), weaver
Adelgunde Vogt (1811–1892), sculptor

W
Olga Wagner (1873–1963), painter and sculptor
Clara Wæver (1855–1930), embroiderer
Elisabeth Wandel (1850–1926), painter
Gertie Wandel (1894–1988), textile artist
Lise Warburg (born 1932), textile artist and writer
Gerda Wegener (1886–1940), painter, illustrator
Bertha Wegmann (1846–1926), portrait painter
Ida Winckler (1907–1995), textile artist, specializing in embroidery

See also
List of Danish women photographers
List of Scandinavian textile artists

-
Danish women artists, List of
Artists
Artists